Sorbon is a commune of the Ardennes department in northern France.

Population

Personalities
It was the birthplace of Robert de Sorbon, (1201–1274), who was a chaplain and Confessor to King Louis IX of France, as well as the founder of the Sorbonne, the University of Paris.

See also
Communes of the Ardennes department

References

Communes of Ardennes (department)
Ardennes communes articles needing translation from French Wikipedia